Podandrogyne brevipedunculata is a species of plant in the Capparaceae family. It is endemic to Ecuador. Its natural habitats are subtropical or tropical moist lowland forests and subtropical or tropical moist montane forests. It is threatened by habitat loss.

References

Cleomaceae
Endemic flora of Ecuador
Endangered plants
Taxonomy articles created by Polbot